The First Baptist Church of Fairport is a historic Baptist church located at 94 South Main Street at Church Street in Fairport, Monroe County, New York. It was built in 1876, and is a -story, cruciform plan, High Victorian Gothic church.  It is constructed of brick and rests on a Medina sandstone foundation. It has a large square corner tower topped by a tall narrow spire. It features ornamental stone trim, a steeply pitched gray slate roof, and 72 original stained, leaded glass windows. In 2006 a national drugstore tried to buy the land but, in response to adverse local reactions including a concert held by local youth musicians, money was raised to help repair the church instead.

It was listed on the National Register of Historic Places in 2006.

References

Churches on the National Register of Historic Places in New York (state)
Gothic Revival church buildings in New York (state)
Churches completed in 1872
19th-century Baptist churches in the United States
Churches in Monroe County, New York
National Register of Historic Places in Monroe County, New York